Gutiérrez was a Spanish weekly satirical magazine which was in circulation between 1927 and 1934 in Madrid, Spain. Its subtitle was semanario español de humorismo (Spanish: Spanish humor weekly). It was among the most read satirical magazines in the country during its lifetime in addition to Buen Humor.

History and profile
Gutiérrez was first published on 7 May 1927. The magazine was published in Madrid on a weekly basis. The founding editor was K-Hito. Major contributors were Miguel Mihura, Enrique Jardiel Poncela, Edgar Neville and Antonio Lara de Gavilán. In June 1933 a short play entitled Eugenesia (Spanish: Eugenics) was featured in Gutiérrez. The magazine also reprinted cartoons produced by the Catalan artists, but these were introduced with some negative captions. It folded following the publication of the 374th issue dated 29 September 1934.

References

External links

1927 establishments in Spain
1934 disestablishments in Spain
Defunct magazines published in Spain
Magazines about comics
Magazines established in 1927
Magazines disestablished in 1934
Magazines published in Madrid
Satirical magazines published in Spain
Spanish humour
Spanish comics titles
Spanish-language magazines
Weekly magazines published in Spain